Zabojnica is a village situated in Knić municipality in Serbia, near the city of Kragujevac.

References

Populated places in Šumadija District